The 1983–84 Montreal Canadiens season was the team's 75th season of play in the National Hockey League. The team struggled on the ice and, for the first time ever in the expansion era, finished the regular season with a losing record. Coach Bob Berry was fired 63 games into the season and replaced with former Canadiens great Jacques Lemaire.

The club placed fourth in its division, which was still good enough to qualify for the playoffs ahead of the last place Hartford Whalers. The Habs then stunned their heavily-favoured rivals, the Boston Bruins with a 3-0 sweep in the opening round. With the upset, Montreal recorded their first playoff series victory since 1980. Then they defeated their provincial rivals, the Quebec Nordiques in the Adams final, in a series notorious for the two bench clearing brawls before the third period of game 6. The Canadiens were finally eliminated in the Prince of Wales Conference finals by the defending Stanley Cup champion New York Islanders in six games.

Regular season

Final standings

Schedule and results

Playoffs
As fourth-place finishers, the Canadiens drew the division winner Boston Bruins as their first round opponent. The Canadiens upset the Bruins, sweeping the series in three straight games. The Canadiens then faced off against the Quebec Nordiques in a "Battle of Quebec" which culminated in the Good Friday Massacre. The Canadiens defeated the Nordiques four games to two to advance against the New York Islanders, the defending  Stanley Cup champion. The Islanders would eliminate the Canadiens in six games.

Player statistics

Regular season
Scoring

Goaltending

Playoffs
Scoring

Goaltending

Awards and records

Transactions

Draft picks
Montreal's draft picks at the 1983 NHL Entry Draft held at the Montreal Forum in Montreal, Quebec.

Farm teams

See also
 1983–84 NHL season

References
 Canadiens on Hockey Database

Montreal Canadiens seasons
Montreal Canadiens season, 1983-84
Montreal